The 1978 Richmond WCT, also known by its sponsored name United Virginia Bank Classic, was a men's tennis tournament played on indoor carpet courts in Richmond, Virginia, United States. The event was part WCT Tour which was incorporated into the 1978 Colgate-Palmolive Grand Prix circuit. It was the 13th edition of the tournament and was held from January 30 through February 5, 1978. Second-seeded Vitas Gerulaitis won the singles title.

Finals

Singles
 Vitas Gerulaitis defeated  John Newcombe 6–3, 6–4
 It was Gerulaitis' 1st singles title of the year and the 9th of his career.

Doubles
 Bob Hewitt /  Frew McMillan defeated  Vitas Gerulaitis /  Sandy Mayer 6–3, 7–5

References

External links
 ITF tournament edition details

Richmond WCT
Richmond WCT
Richmond WCT
Richmond WCT
Richmond WCT